Fulda rhadama is a species of butterfly in the family Hesperiidae. It is found in northern, central and eastern Madagascar. The habitat consists of forest margins and cleared forests.

References

Butterflies described in 1833
Astictopterini